Nymphodorus may refer to:

 Nymphodorus (physician) 
 Nymphodorus of Abdera